This page tabulates only the most prominent mountains of the Alps, selected for having a topographic prominence of at least , and all of them exceeding  in height. Although the list contains 537 summits, some significant alpine mountains are necessarily excluded for failing to meet the stringent prominence criterion.

The list of these most prominent mountains is continued down to 2500 m elevation at List of prominent mountains of the Alps (2500–2999 m) and down to 2000 m elevation on List of prominent mountains of the Alps (2000–2499 m). All such mountains are located in either France, Italy, Switzerland, Liechtenstein, Austria, Germany or Slovenia, even in some lower regions. Together, these three lists include all 44 ultra-prominent peaks of the Alps, with 19 ultras over 3000m on this page.

For a definitive list of all 82 the highest peaks of the Alps, as identified by the International Climbing and Mountaineering Federation (UIAA), and often referred to as the 'Alpine four-thousanders', see List of mountains of the Alps over 4000 metres.

Criteria
The International Climbing and Mountaineering Federation defines a summit in the Alps as independent, if the connecting ridge between it and a higher summit drops at least 30 m (a prominence/drop of 30 m, with the lowest point referred to as the "key col"). There are over 3300 such summits exceeding 2500 m in Switzerland alone. In order for a peak to qualify as an independent mountain, traditionally a prominence of at least 300 m, or 10 times the aforementioned criterion value, has been used. Inclusion based on prominence is expedient for its objectivity and verifiability. It also allows the incorporation of the low elevation (but prominent) mountains as well as the highest mountains, maximizing territory coverage and ensuring a reasonably even distribution throughout the range. However, it has its drawbacks. For example, an impressive mountain peak dominating a valley may be connected via long high ridges to a barely higher hidden summit. Among the better-known peaks absent from this list are Aiguille du Dru (due to Aiguille Verte), Dent du Géant (Grandes Jorasses), Mont Blanc de Cheilon (Ruinette), Nadelhorn and Täschhorn (Dom), Wetterhorn (Mittelhorn), Piz d'Err (Piz Calderas), Piz Badile (Piz Cengalo), Piz Palü (Piz Zupo), Similaun (Hintere Schwarze), Crozzon di Brenta (Cima Tosa), and Cimon della Pala (Cima Vezzana).

Accuracy
All mountain heights and prominences on the list are from the largest-scale maps available.
However, heights often conflict on different topographic maps, even when created by the same cartographic institution. For example, the Fletschhorn is indicated to be 3993, 3982, and 3984.5 m high on the 1:100,000, 1:50,000 and 1:25,000 Swisstopo map, respectively. The (rounded) elevation of the latter map is used in this table.
Also, the deepest points in connecting ridges are not always survey points with spot elevations, where heights have to be estimated from contour lines. For example, maps often provide heights for the place where a route passes over a ridge rather than for the lowest point of that pass.

Finally, many height indications on these maps are from quite old measurements, while glacier and firn melt has decreased the height of both peaks and key cols, sometimes quite dramatically. For example, in 1930, glacier-capped Cima Tosa was the highest mountain of the Brenta Dolomites at 3,173 m, but now is around 3,140 m high and some 10 m lower than its rocky neighbor Cima Brenta (3,151 m). Most maps and guides still report Cima Tosa's old height. On the other hand, in the 1930s, when the current Italian 1:25.000 topographic map of the region was created, the Passo del Vannino, northwest of the Ofenhorn, was covered by the Lebendun glacier and was measured to be 2,754 m, while the much more recent Swisstopo map shows it to be bare and 2,717 m high. This is the key col for Corno di Ban (3,028 m), which, thanks to the retreat of the glacier, now appears on the list with a prominence of 311 m.

Given the inaccuracies, the list includes (unranked) summits with estimated prominences down to 7 meter below the cut-off (293 m), many of which may very well have a real prominence exceeding 300 m.

Distribution
The lists contain 1599 mountains higher than 2000 m. The summits are distributed over 7 countries as follows:

175 of the summits are on international borders. A number of mountains (e.g. Rocciamelone (IT), Aiguille de Tré la Tête (IT), Monte Rosa (CH), Piz Bernina (CH), and Hochgall (IT)) straddle borders as well, but have their summit on one side. In the list, only the exact location of the culminating point of the mountain is considered.

The 1092 mountains over 2500 m are found in 44 different administrative regions (cantons, departments, provinces, states). The administrative regions with the most mountains over 2500 m are Tyrol (161), Graubünden (148), Valais (103), South Tyrol (91), Sondrio (73), Aosta Valley (69), Savoy (67), Hautes-Alpes (66), Salzburg (57), Belluno (56) and Trentino (50).

The table below shows the distribution of mountains by height and prominence. Totals do not include the 54 unranked summits with 293–299 m prominence. Cima Brenta is treated as having a prominence of 1500m for consistency with lists of ultras.

Alpine mountains over 3000 m high with 300 m prominence

The table is continued here.

Notes

References

Sources
Jonathan de Ferranti & Eberhard Jurgalski's map-checked ALPS TO R589m and rough, computer-generated EUROPE TO R150m lists 
Christian Thöni's list of 8875 summits in Switzerland
Clem Clements' Austria above 2500 m lists
Mark Trengrove and Clem Clements' list of German alps above 2000 m,
Mark Trengrove's lists of several regions of the French Alps, and of the Grand paradiso and Rutor ranges of the Italian Alps

See also 

List of mountains of the Alps (2500–2999 m)
List of mountains of the Alps (2000–2499 m)
List of Alpine peaks by prominence
List of Alpine four-thousanders
List of the highest mountains in Austria
List of the highest mountains in Germany
List of mountains in Italy
List of mountains in Slovenia
List of mountains of Switzerland

3000 m
Alps